Sir Thomas Raleigh, KCSI, KC (2 December 1850 – 8 February 1920) was a British lawyer and academic. A fellow of All Souls College, Oxford since 1876, he was Reader in English Law at the University of Oxford from 1884 to 1896, Registrar of the Privy Council from 1896 to 1899, and Legal Member of Viceroy’s Executive Council in India from 1899 to 1904. He was Member of the Council of India from 1909 to 1913.

He was appointed an English King's Counsel in 1908.

In India, he was Vice-Chancellor of the University of Calcutta and chaired the Indian Universities Commission of 1902.

References 

 "Death of Sir T. Raleigh", The Times, 9 February 1920, p. 18
 "Sir Thomas Raleigh", The Daily Telegraph, 9 February 1920, p. 8
 Spenser Wilkinson, "Sir Thomas Raleigh", The Sunday Times, 15 February 1920, p. 11

1850 births
1920 deaths
Knights Commander of the Order of the Star of India
Fellows of All Souls College, Oxford
English King's Counsel
British legal scholars
Members of the Council of the Governor General of India
Members of the Council of India
Alumni of Balliol College, Oxford
University of Tübingen alumni
Presidents of the Oxford Union
People educated at Edinburgh Academy
Members of Lincoln's Inn
Vice Chancellors of the University of Calcutta
Liberal Party (UK) parliamentary candidates
Liberal Unionist Party parliamentary candidates
20th-century King's Counsel